Gary Leon Williams (born September 4, 1959) is a former American football wide receiver in the National Football League who played for the Cincinnati Bengals. He played college football for the Ohio State Buckeyes. He holds the record for most consecutive games with a catch at 48 (as of December 7, 2019, KJ Hill was at 47 with the potential to tie or break the record).

References

1959 births
Living people
American football wide receivers
Cincinnati Bengals players
Ohio State Buckeyes football players